The Howrah–Dhanbad Double Decker Express was a Superfast train of Indian Railways, which was the first of its type to be introduced. It was accommodated with latest stainless steel LHB coach, manufactured at Kapurthala Coach Factory. It connected Kolkata, capital of West Bengal and Dhanbad, an important city in Jharkhand. With this India joins the league of Europe and North America that run double-decker trains. This new AC design had several features namely stainless steel body, high-speed Eurofima design bogies with air springs and fire safety-features. The coaches had a control discharge toilet system. The train comprised five AC Double Deck Chair Cars and two End-On-Generation Vans. This train was regularly hauled by a WAP-7 locomotive. Sometimes, a WAP-4 locomotive was also be seen as an off-link. The train last ran in December 2014. Since 1 January 2015, the train has been cancelled/discontinued. At present the train is lying unmaintained in platform no.16 of Howrah station. This train is considered one of the most unsuccessful trains on this route. According to recent news reports the train will be scrapped sooner than later.

See also
 Kolkata Duronto
 Delhi Duronto
 Howrah–New Jalpaiguri Shatabdi Express
 Bhagalpur–Anand Vihar Terminal Garib Rath Express

References

Rail transport in Howrah
Double-decker trains of India
Rail transport in West Bengal
Rail transport in Jharkhand
Transport in Dhanbad
Railway services introduced in 2011
Defunct trains in India